Aidan Mahaney is an American college basketball player for Saint Mary's Gaels of the West Coast Conference.

Early life and high school career
Mahaney grew up in Lafayette, California and attended Campolindo High School. He started on the varsity team as a freshman and averaged 16 points per game as the Cougars won the Division II state championship. Mahaney averaged 19.4 points per game during his sophomore season. As a senior, he averaged 17.2 points, 3.9 assists, 3.7 rebounds, and 1.3 steals per game and was named the Bay Area News Group Player of the Year. Mahaney was rated a four-star recruit and committed to play college basketball at Saint Mary's College (SMC) over offers from California, Stanford, and Princeton.

College career
Mahaney entered his freshman season with the Saint Mary's Gaels coming off the bench as a reserve guard. He made his collegiate debut in SMC's season opener against Oral Roberts and scored 25 points in 26 minutes played. Mahaney became the team's starting point guard one month into the season. Mahaney scored 18 total points and 16 points in the second half and overtime in a 78–70 win over 12th-ranked Gonzaga.

Personal life
Mahaney's older brother, Carter, plays college basketball at Northern Arizona.

References

External links
Saint Mary's Gaels bio

Living people
American men's basketball players
Basketball players from California
Point guards
Saint Mary's Gaels men's basketball players